Shazia Ashfaq Mattu is a Pakistani politician who had been a member of the National Assembly of Pakistan, from June 2013 to May 2018.

Early life and education
Mattu was born in Gujranwala. She received her degree of MA in Urdu from University of the Punjab, Lahore.

Political career
She was elected to the Provincial Assembly of the Punjab as a candidate of Pakistan Muslim League (N) from PP-95 (Gujranwala-V) constituency in 2008 Pakistani general election.

She was indirectly elected to the National Assembly of Pakistan as a candidate of Pakistan Muslim League (N) on reserved seats for women from Punjab in 2013 Pakistani general election.

References

Living people
Pakistan Muslim League (N) politicians
Pakistani people of Kashmiri descent
Punjabi people
Pakistani MNAs 2013–2018
University of the Punjab alumni
Women members of the National Assembly of Pakistan
Year of birth missing (living people)
21st-century Pakistani women politicians